William Lawrence Carberry (March 13, 1885 – January 14, 1973) was an American college football player and coach. He served as the head football coach at Southern State Normal School—now known as the University of South Dakota–Springfield–in 1927 and at Northern State Normal School—now known as Northern State University—in Aberdeen, South Dakota from 1933 to 1939 and 1942 to 1945.

References

External links
 

1885 births
1973 deaths
Iowa Hawkeyes football players
Northern State Wolves athletic directors
Northern State Wolves football coaches
Northern State Wolves men's basketball coaches
South Dakota–Springfield Pointers athletic directors
South Dakota–Springfield Pointers football coaches
People from Panora, Iowa
Coaches of American football from Iowa
Players of American football from Iowa
Basketball coaches from Iowa